Gustaaf Lauwereins (born 21 June 1941) is a Belgian judoka. He competed in the men's lightweight event at the 1972 Summer Olympics.

References

1941 births
Living people
Belgian male judoka
Olympic judoka of Belgium
Judoka at the 1972 Summer Olympics
Sportspeople from Preston, Lancashire
20th-century Belgian people